Fulton v. City of Philadelphia, 593 U.S. ___ (2021), was a United States Supreme Court case dealing with litigation over discrimination of local regulations based on the Free Exercise Clause and Establishment Clause of the First Amendment to the United States Constitution. The specific case deals with a religious-backed foster care agency that was denied a new contract by the City of Philadelphia, Pennsylvania, due to the agency's refusal to certify married same-sex couples as foster parents on religious grounds. 

In a unanimous judgment on June 17, 2021, the Court ruled that the city's refusal due to the agency's same-sex couple policy violated the Free Exercise Clause. The case was decided on narrow grounds outside of the Supreme Court's prior decision in Employment Division v. Smith, which had previously ruled that neutral laws of general applicability could not be challenged for violating religious exemptions. Instead, in Fulton, the court ruled that services like foster care contracting were not generally applicable under Smith, and thus were subject to strict scrutiny review. Because the city allowed for exceptions to be made in its anti-discrimination policy for foster care certification, the Court deemed the city's refusal to grant an exemption for Catholic Social Services as violating its free exercise of religion under Smith.

Background
The Roman Catholic Archdiocese of Philadelphia runs the Catholic Social Services of the Archdiocese of Philadelphia (CSS), which has operated a foster care agency in Philadelphia for over 100 years. The foster care agency had been registered with the city up through 2018.

The Philadelphia Inquirer ran an article on March 13, 2018, which described the experience of a same-sex couple that went to an information session at Bethany Christian Service, which operated its own foster care service separate from CSS. At the session, the couple were told they would be wasting time because there was a policy for refusing to certify same-sex couples as foster parents. In following up, the reporter discovered that CSS held a similar policy, and had spoken to the city's Department of Human Services, which oversaw regulating foster care services, to notify them of these issues. The Commissioner of Human Services for the city, Cynthia Figueroa, followed up on the report with both CSS and Bethany Christian Services to confirm its veracity towards discrimination against same-sex couples. Figueroa also reviewed the standard with other registered foster care agencies for the city, many also who were also run by religious organizations, but found none of the others had similar restrictions against same-sex couples. Within a few days of the article's publication, the city suspended CSS's contract; the Bethany Christian Service had been able to work a deal to accept foster care from same-sex couples to maintain theirs. 

CSS and several foster couples under CSS, including Black Catholic foster mothers Sharonell Fulton and Toni Simms-Busch, brought litigation against the city in the United States District Court for the Eastern District of Pennsylvania under the Free Exercise Clause and Establishment Clause of First Amendment to the United States Constitution, the Pennsylvania State Religious Freedom Restoration Acts, Free Speech Clause of the First Amendment and the Religious Freedom Restoration Act of 1993, Pub. L. No. 103-141, 107 Stat. 1488 (November 16, 1993), codified at  through  (also known as RFRA). CSS also had argued from the recent Supreme Court decision of Masterpiece Cakeshop v. Colorado Civil Rights Commission that they had been subject to hostility from the city based on anti-religious prejudice. The city countered that the precedent set by Employment Division v. Smith, alongside that other agencies in the city with similar religious backing accepted same-sex foster couples, supported the city's decision to terminate CSS's contract. 

The District Court refused to grant a preliminary injunction against the city's contract termination, leading CSS to appeal to the Third Circuit. The Third Circuit unanimously ruled against CSS, upholding the city's claim against Employment Division v. Smith.

Supreme Court
CSS and the foster parents petitioned to the Supreme Court to hear the case, which was certified in February 2020. Oral arguments occurred over telephone on November 4, 2020; Neal Katyal offered oral argument for the city.

Oral arguments

Background of oral arguments
On November 4, the Court heard oral arguments in Fulton, in which Catholic Social Services (CSS) sued the city of Philadelphia over CSS's having been offered a new contract enforcing the city's Fair Practices Ordinance that bars discrimination in accommodations. CSS says that for religious reasons it can not vet potential foster parents who are gay couples. CSS's suit asks the Court to overrule its 1990 decision Employment Division v. Smith that allows the government to enforce neutral and generally applicable laws without having to make exceptions for individual religions. CSS also contends that even under Smith the Court should find that the faith-based charity had been unfairly targeted by the city, given that the city allows race- and disability-based exceptions within foster-care placements, and Smith held that "where the State has in place a system of individual exemptions, it may not refuse to extend that system to cases of 'religious hardship' without compelling reason." CSS further claims that the law is shown to not be "neutral" as required under Smith, since the city referred to CSS's motives as "discrimination that occurs under the guise of religious freedom". This argument is similar to the one made in Masterpiece Cakeshop, where the Court held that the government had not enforced the law in a manner that was neutral toward religion. The city of Philadelphia argues that the law is neutral and generally applicable, as required by Smith, and that the Court's ruling in CSS's favor would impinge on the civil rights of not only LGBT individuals but potentially those of such groups as religious minorities.

Oral arguments
Some of the Court's conservative members like Justice Amy Coney Barrett didn't reveal their positions, while others did. Two conservative members made clear that in their eyes the city of Philadelphia is not respectful of the religious beliefs held by Catholic Social Services (CSS). It appeared to Justice Brett Kavanaugh that Philadelphia was “looking for a fight” and “created a clash.” Justice Samuel Alito noted that the case wasn't about same-sex couples in Philadelphia having the opportunity to be foster parents, but it's “the fact the city can’t stand the message that Catholic Social Services and the Archdiocese are sending by continuing to adhere to the old-fashioned view about marriage.” Justice Stephen Breyer from the liberal wing of the Court asked Lori Windham, who argued on behalf of CSS: "What’s the problem? I still don’t quite see it." Windham answered that even if the religious-backed foster care agency were to “tag a disclaimer” on its forms related to same-sex couples, CSS would still require the group to “evaluate, assess, and approve” of relationships that go against its religious beliefs. 

Justice Breyer and the other two liberal justices Elena Kagan and Sonia Sotomayor seemed to be intrigued by arguments from Philadelphia's attorney Neal Katyal, who stated that the stakes of the case go beyond the current case and includes virtually all government services. Katyal said a religious exemption to Philadelphia’s nondiscrimination law by the Supreme Court would “radiate far beyond foster care.” According to him this would allow private contractors to refuse to provide services to religious groups from “Buddhist to Baptist” if those contractors cite their own religious convictions. The central question during oral argument was whether CSS is running a government program or is it the recipient of a license to provide a service. This distinction is crucial, for "it could determine the outcome and allow the court to avoid confronting the vexing intersection of religious liberties and marriage equality." CSS request to the Supreme Court to overrule its precedent Employment Division v. Smith case, in which it was decided that neutral laws of general applicability don't violate the First Amendment’s Free Exercise Clause, didn't play a central part during oral argument, which lasted approximately one hour and 45 minutes. According to the New York Times,  questions posed by newly appointed Associate Justice Amy Coney Barrett during the case's oral arguments were "evenhanded and did not reveal her position."

Decision
The Court issued its decision on June 17, 2021. In a unanimous judgment, the Court reversed the Third Circuit's ruling and remanded the case for further review. The majority opinion was written by Chief Justice John Roberts and joined by Justices Stephen Breyer, Sonia Sotomayor, Elena Kagan, Brett Kavanaugh, and Amy Coney Barrett. The decision was made on narrow grounds beyond the scope of Smith.  Roberts identified that the anti-discrimination clause in the city's foster care certification policy included an allowance for exceptions to be made by the Commissioner of Human Services. Roberts found that with this exception capability, the anti-discrimination clause failed via Smith, in that "where the State has in place a system of individual exemptions, it may not refuse to extend that system to cases of 'religious hardship' without compelling reason". Roberts wrote that the city's policy to deny contracting CSS due to their same-sex couple policy violated the Free Exercise Clause. Roberts concluded that "The City has burdened CSS's religious exercise through policies that do not satisfy the threshold requirement of being neutral and generally applicable", and thus ruled against the city. Roberts wrote "it is plain that the city's actions have burdened CSS's religious exercise by putting it to the choice of curtailing its mission or approving relationships inconsistent with its beliefs." Roberts wrote that foster care services do not fall as a public accommodation, and as such, the Court applied strict scrutiny review of the city's policies towards any potential discrimination. 

Justice Barrett wrote a concurring opinion to which Justice Kavanaugh joined and Justice Breyer joined for all but the first paragraph. While Barrett wrote that "the textual and structural arguments against Smith...are compelling", she joined in the majority in the narrow opinion that did not evoke Smith, stating that "There would be a number of issues to work through if Smith were overruled."

Justice Samuel Alito wrote an opinion concurring in judgment, which was joined by Justices Clarence Thomas and Neil Gorsuch. Justice Gorsuch also wrote an opinion concurring in judgment, which Thomas and Alito joined. In both opinions, the Justices expressed concerns that the majority rationale for the judgment did not do enough to support religious freedoms and had left Smith in place. Alito called for the overturning of Smith and wrote in his opinion "The Court has emitted a wisp of a decision that leaves religious liberty in a confused and vulnerable state. Those who count on this Court to stand up for the First Amendment have every right to be disappointed -- as am I." Alito opined that the Smith standard should be replaced with "the standard that Smith replaced: A law that imposes a substantial burden on religious exercise can be sustained only if it is narrowly tailored to serve a compelling government interest." Gorsuch's opinion echoed Alito's call for overturning Smith, adding that the majority opinion had undertaken a "dizzying series of maneuvers" to arrive at their judgment.

Reactions
Prior to the Court's ruling, Fulton had been anticipated to be a landmark case in the conflict between freedom of religious expression and LGBT rights; with the Court's conservative majority, it had been expected that the decision would have been a significant victory for religious groups and a loss for LGBT supporters. Instead, the Court's decision was seen as narrowly focused that only gave a small victory for conservative religious groups, and bypassed larger questions that had been asked regarding the accommodations for LGBT by religion-based groups in governmental regulations. Mark Joseph Stern for Slate opined that Roberts had written the opinion in a narrow matter to minimize the impact on LGBT rights so as to bring the liberal members of the Court into joining with the majority. 

Legal experts stated that the decision was tailored around the specific wording in Philadelphia's contract, which made a specific exemption in the anti-discrimination clause, and likely would not apply for a governmental regulation that lacked such exemption language and was applied broadly. Other legal scholars believed that since the judgment was unanimous, it signaled that the decision was a significant result that would instruct lower courts to rule against any government regulation that singled out against a religious practice. The narrowness of the decision in Fulton was compared to the Court's approach in deciding Masterpiece Cakeshop v. Colorado Civil Rights Commission in 2018, where a baker refused to provide a custom-made cake for a gay couple's wedding and had faced action under the Colorado anti-discrimination laws; in Masterpiece, the Court similarly ruled on a narrow basis on the approach Colorado had taken in reprimanding the baker, rather than establish any landmark decision.

Philadelphia's City Solicitor Diana Cortes called the ruling a "difficult and disappointing setback" but was also gratified that the decision did not "radically change existing constitutional law to adopt a standard that would force court-ordered religious exemptions from civic obligations in every arena." A lawyer at The Becket Fund for Religious Liberty, which represented CSS and other foster care groups in the case, named Lori Windham stated that the Court's decision was a "common-sense ruling in favor of religious social services". "It’s a beautiful day when the highest court in the land protects foster moms and the 200-year-old religious ministry that supports them", said Lori Windham, the senior counsel at Becket who argued the case in Fulton. Plaintiffs Sharronell Fulton and Toni Simms-Busch were both pleased with the ruling; Fulton stated "I am overjoyed that the Supreme Court recognized the import work of Catholic Social Services and has allowed me to continue fostering children most in need of a loving home", while Simms-Busch said "The Supreme Court’s decision ensures the most vulnerable children in the City of Brotherly Love have every opportunity to find loving homes."

Civil rights organization that (also) focuses on lesbian, gay, bisexual, and transgender (LGBT) people and communities reacted differently to the court's decision. Their reactions ranged from the emphasis upon the narrow grounds on which the decision rested to deep disappointment. The Supreme Court's decision was regarded as an infringement on the rights of LGBTQ parents by LGBTQ Nation. Ronald E. Richter, the CEO of New York City's largest foster care system, stated that the decision "to allow private agencies that receive tax dollars to provide government services to discriminate against LGBTQ+ families like mine is devastating for the human rights of people who identify as LGBTQ+". However, the ACLU LGBT + HIV Project, which helped to defend two agencies on behalf of the city, supported the ruling, stating that the Court denied "opponents of LGBTQ equality" the "constitutional right to opt out of [non-discrimination protections] when discrimination is motivated by religious beliefs".

Religious groups were also mixed on the decision. Progressive religious groups were generally disappointed by the decision, but some like the Americans United for Separation of Church & State commended the Court for maintaining a narrow decision. Conservative religious groups were generally more supportive of the Court's ruling, though recognized the narrowness of the ruling. The Family Research Council called the ruling "a substantial win for religious liberty", and "In a time of growing hostility towards religion, the Supreme Court's reaffirmation of this fundamental freedom is even more critical." The Southern Baptist Convention stated that the ruling "prohibits no one from serving children" but "simply ends state discrimination against religious groups."  American attorney Roger Severino who served as the director of the Office of Civil Rights (OCR) at the United States Department of Health and Human Services opined that "religious liberty won 9 votes" in a "nearly unbroken religious-freedom win streak now stretches back decades, essentially all the way to the Employment Division v. Smith decision from 1990 ... ."

References

Further reading

External links 
 

Adoption law
2021 in United States case law
United States Supreme Court cases
United States Supreme Court cases of the Roberts Court
United States LGBT rights case law
United States free exercise of religion case law
2021 in LGBT history